Ebrima Sohna (born 14 December 1988) is a Gambian footballer. He plays as a midfielder.

Career

KuPS
In February 2014, Sohna resigned for KuPS on a one-year contract, extending his deal by another year in October 2014.

Al-Arabi SC
On January 13, 2016 he signed a 1-year and a half Deal with the Kuwaiti side.

Keşla
In January 2018, Sohna signed for Keşla FK on a contract until the end of the 2017–18 season. On 22 June 2018, Sohna a new contract with Keşla until the end of the 2018/19 season, leaving in December 2018.

International career
Sohna is a holding midfielder who with his fellow country men won the CAF U-17 Championship in Banjul 2005. He went on to be a key part of the Gambian team which beat Brazil in the 2005 FIFA U-17 World Championship in Peru.

Sohna also helped the Gambia U-20 to qualify for the CAF U-20 Youth Championship CONGO 2007, where the Gambia came out third position thus qualifying for the FIFA U-20 Youth Championship in Canada. Back in Gambia where Sohna started his career in the youth system of Wallidan FC one of the top club in Gambian football.

Sohna scored his first international goal against Mexico on 23 December 2007.

Career statistics

Club

International

International goals
Scores and results list the Gambia's goal tally first.

References

External links

 

1988 births
Living people
Gambian footballers
The Gambia international footballers
Wallidan FC players
Sandefjord Fotball players
Rovaniemen Palloseura players
Kuopion Palloseura players
Al-Arabi SC (Kuwait) players
FC Vostok players
Vaasan Palloseura players
Shamakhi FK players
Eliteserien players
Norwegian First Division players
Veikkausliiga players
Kazakhstan Premier League players
Azerbaijan Premier League players
Gambian expatriate footballers
Expatriate footballers in Norway
Expatriate footballers in Finland
Expatriate footballers in Kazakhstan
Expatriate footballers in Kuwait
Expatriate footballers in Azerbaijan
Association football midfielders
Gambian expatriate sportspeople in Kuwait
Gambian expatriate sportspeople in Azerbaijan
Gambian expatriate sportspeople in Kazakhstan
Gambian expatriate sportspeople in Finland
Gambian expatriate sportspeople in Norway
Kuwait Premier League players
Mosta F.C. players
Gambian expatriate sportspeople in Malta
Expatriate footballers in Malta
Maltese Premier League players
2021 Africa Cup of Nations players